Jaime Belmonte Magdaleno (8 October 1934 – 21 January 2009), was a Mexican professional footballer, known as El Flaco (The Slim Man), He was also called El héroe de Solna (The hero of Solna), in reference to his goal scored vs Wales in the city of Solna during the 1958 World Cup earning Mexico's first point in a world cup.

Career
Born in Mexico City, Belmonte began playing professional football with Deportivo Cuautla. He made 89 appearances for the club from 1955 to 1959. In 1959, he joined Deportivo Irapuato. In 13 seasons with Irapuato, Belmonte scored 125 goals.

International
Belmonte played for the Mexico national football team at the 1958 FIFA World Cup in Sweden. He scored the goal in a 1–1 draw with Wales in Solna, earning Mexico its first point at the World Cup hence earning the nickname the hero of Solna.

Personal
Belmonte died from cancer in 2009 at age 74.

In 2012, Belmonte received a statue in his honour, outside Irapuato FC's stadium Estadio Sergio León Chávez.

References

External links

1934 births
2009 deaths
Mexico international footballers
1958 FIFA World Cup players
Irapuato F.C. footballers
Footballers from Mexico City
Liga MX players
Association football wingers
Mexican footballers